Arthur Edward Blanchette (March 23, 1921 - August 30, 2003) was a Canadian diplomat. Born in Hartford, Connecticut, he graduated from the University of Montreal in 1940 and took his PhD in 1945 in Ottawa where he entered in the Latin-American section of the Wartime information board. In 1969 he was at the Direction between francophone countries. He was Chargé d'Affaires to Egypt then Acting High Commissioner to South Africa followed by Acting Commissioner at the ICSC for Cambodia, then Chargé d'Affaires a.i. to Greece before returning home to a post in the department of francophone countries at External Affairs in Ottawa. Then Ambassador and Permanent Observer to the Organization of American States then to Tunisia, and, after an extended impasse, non-resident ambassador to Libya.

After retiring from foreign service, Blanchette became director of the historical division of the Department of External Affairs. He caused some controversy in 1983 due to a book he was preparing on the department's history. Some figures who appeared in the proposed book, including former External Affairs minister and future Prime Minister, Paul Martin, objected to its content.

Blanchette was the editor of two volumes of speeches and papers entitled Canadian Foreign Policy.

He was the father of Alix Cléo Roubaud.

References

External links 
 Foreign Affairs and International Trade Canada Complete List of Posts

Permanent Representatives of Canada to the Organization of American States
1921 births
2003 deaths
Ambassadors of Canada to Egypt
Ambassadors of Canada to Cambodia
Ambassadors of Canada to Greece
High Commissioners of Canada to South Africa
Ambassadors of Canada to Tunisia
Ambassadors of Canada to Libya
Canadian book editors
American emigrants to Canada